Matteo Vittucci (1919 – 2011) was an American dancer, choreographer, teacher, and scholar. He graduated from Cornell University with a B.S. and later received an M.A. in Dance Education from Springfield College.  Having trained at the Metropolitan Opera Ballet School, Matteo (who went by only his first name professionally) began his career as a ballet dancer with the Metropolitan Opera Ballet.  In 1953, he made his first appearance as an ethnic dance soloist - ethnic-dance, rather than ballet, became his area of expertise.  Matteo studied with ethnic-dance experts such as La Meri and went on to study, present, and teach numerous traditional dance forms from nations such as Japan, India, and Spain.  He is the author of "The Language of Spanish Dance: A Dictionary and Reference Manual" as well as "Woods that Dance," a study of the use of castanets.

In 1954, Matteo formed a professional partnership with American dancer Carola Goya, whom he married twenty years later. Together, Matteo and Goya founded the Indo-American Dance Company (the company also performed under the names Foundation for Ethnic Dance and the Matteo Ethno-American Dance Theater).  By keeping flamenco alive in the United States in the mid-late 20th century, Matteo and Goya successfully cultivated a cultural link between Spain and America.

References

External links
Archival footage of Carola Goya and Matteo performing at Jacob's Pillow in 1963

1919 births
2011 deaths
Cornell University alumni
Springfield College (Massachusetts) alumni
American male ballet dancers
American choreographers
People from Utica, New York
20th-century American ballet dancers